Peter A. Coclanis is an American historian, currently the Albert Ray Newsome Distinguished Professor at University of North Carolina at Chapel Hill. His current concerns are business history and has studied places such as the American South and Southeast Asia.

References

Year of birth missing (living people)
Living people
University of North Carolina at Chapel Hill faculty
21st-century American historians
21st-century American male writers
American male non-fiction writers